The emerald-eyed tree frog (Boana crepitans) is a species of frog in the family Hylidae. It is largely restricted to the Atlantic Forest region of Brazil. Some populations previously regarded as Boana crepitans have been separated into the species Boana xerophylla and Boana platanera.

Diagnostic Description

Adult

Species description based on Ibanez et al. (1999) and Duellman (2001).  A large treefrog with long, slender arms and legs (males to 59 mm, females to 68 mm). Males have a dagger-like spine at the base of the thumb.

Dorsal

The dorsal surface is pinkish tan with some darker brown spots, blotches or other markings. A thin, dark middorsal stripe is usually present. Dark bars are present on the upper surfaces of the thighs, and extend onto the rear surfaces of the thighs.

Concealed surfaces

The concealed surfaces are colored similarly to the dorsum, except for the dark barring on the rear surfaces of the thighs.

Eye

The eye is grey, with a bronzy or yellowish cast.

Extremities

The webbing between the hands and feet is not particularly extensive in Hypsiboas crepitans. The webbing is pale in coloration.

Habitat and Ecology

This species has a variety of habitats, ranging from humid tropical forests, semiarid environments, grasslands, llanos, intervening habitats, pastures and lower montane forests. It is an arboreal nocturnal species, found on leaves of trees, on shrubs and other vegetation near watercourses. The species breeds in temporary pools at the beginning of the rainy season. Specimens are occasionally also found on the ground. It is possible to find this species in severely degraded habitats including urban areas and human dwellings.

Life Cycle

Breeding season
Breeding occurs throughout much of the rainy season (Ibanez et al. 1999, Duellman 2001). Males call from the edges of temporary ponds or flooded grassy areas (Ibanez et al. 1999).

Egg
Females may lay over 1,000 eggs in a single oviposition event.

Tadpole

Tadpoles are grey or light brown (Duellman 2001). The tail has more yellow undertones (Duellman 2001). The tadpole body is ovoid, with a rather long tail that ends in a distinct point (Duellman 2001). The upper caudal fin is much deeper than the lower (Duellman 2001).

References

Boana
Frogs of South America
Amphibians of Brazil
Amphibians described in 1824
Taxonomy articles created by Polbot